Jake Bickelhaupt is an American chef based in Chicago, Illinois. His two-Michelin-star restaurant 42 Grams was the subject of a 2017 documentary of the same name. The film focuses on Bickelhaupt and his then-wife, Alexandra Welsh, as they turned an illegal restaurant operating out of his home into the brick-and-mortar 42 Grams in less than a year. In 2018, 42 Grams closed after Bickelhaupt pleaded guilty following domestic abuse charges filed by Welsh. As of 2018, Bickelhaupt runs the underground restaurant Konro.

References

External links 
 

Year of birth missing (living people)
Living people
American chefs
American male chefs
Head chefs of Michelin starred restaurants